The Mississippi County Jail was a historic county jail building in Osceola, Arkansas.  It was a three-story brick structure, six bays wide, with entrances at the outer two bays, which projected slightly and were set off from the central portion by brick pilasters and a decorative parapet at the roof line.  The county built the jail in 1926; it was demolished in 2016.

The building was listed on the National Register of Historic Places in 1987.  It was delisted in 2017.

See also
National Register of Historic Places listings in Mississippi County, Arkansas

References

Jails on the National Register of Historic Places in Arkansas
Government buildings completed in 1926
Osceola, Arkansas
National Register of Historic Places in Mississippi County, Arkansas
Former National Register of Historic Places in Arkansas
Demolished buildings and structures in Arkansas
1926 establishments in Arkansas
1987 disestablishments in Arkansas